A felid hybrid is any of a number of hybrids between various species of the cat family, Felidae.  This article deals with hybrids between the species of the subfamily Felinae (feline hybrids).

For hybrids between two species of the genus Panthera (lions, tigers, jaguars, and leopards), see Panthera hybrid.  There are no known hybrids between Neofelis (the clouded leopard) and other genera.  By contrast, many genera of Felinae are interfertile with each other, though few hybridize under natural conditions, and not all combinations are likely to be viable (e.g. between the tiny rusty-spotted cat and the leopard-sized cougar).

All-wild feline hybridization

Caracal × serval hybrids
Hybrid offspring of a male caracal and a female serval have occurred once by accident, when a Los Angeles zookeeper kept the parents together. The other form, caravals, are bred from a female caracal and a male serval; they are bred for the pet market at one point.

Bobcat × lynx

The blynx or lynxcat is a hybrid of a bobcat (Lynx rufus) and some other species of genus Lynx.  The appearance of the offspring depends on which lynx species is used, as the Eurasian lynx  (Lynx lynx) is more heavily spotted than the Canada lynx (Lynx canadensis). These hybrids have been bred in captivity and also occur naturally where a lynx or bobcat cannot find a member of its own species for mating.

At least seven such hybrids have been reported in the United States, outside of captivity.  In August 2003, two wild-occurring hybrids between wild Canadian lynx and bobcats were confirmed by DNA analysis in the Moosehead region of Maine. Three hybrids were identified in northeastern Minnesota. These were the first confirmed hybrids outside of captivity. Mitochondrial DNA studies showed them all to be the result of matings between female Canada lynx and male bobcats. A male Canada lynx × bobcat hybrid was trapped in 1998, radio-collared and released, only to die of starvation.  The female hybrid was fertile.  In November 2003, a spotted lynxcat was observed in Illinois,  from normal lynx territory, but it may have been an escaped hybrid pet.

The hybrids closely resembled bobcats with larger bodies and smaller feet, but had some lynx-like features: long ear tufts and almost completely black-tipped tails. The Canada lynx is a protected species in 14 US states constituting the southern part of its historic range, but the hybrids are not protected and may be shot by hunters.  However, some of odd-looking Lynx may be colour morphs of either bobcats or Canada lynx rather than hybrids.  This poses the danger that protected Canada lynx are being killed.

European wildcat × jungle cat
The Euro-chaus is a human-induced hybrid between the European wildcat (Felis silvestris) and the jungle cat species.  It should not be confused with the Euro-chausie, which is a cross between the domestic Chausie breed and a European wildcat .

Margay × ocelot
The marlot is a hybrid between a male margay (Leopardus wiedii) and female ocelot (L. pardalis).  In May 1977, the Long Island Ocelot Club (LIOC) announced the birth of a marlot bred by Barbara Brocks using captive-bred parents. There was no description of the marlot, but the parent species both have rosetted or marbled patterns on a sandy background.

Margay × oncilla hybridization attempts
There were attempts to breed the margay with the oncilla (Leopardus tigrinus) by Dutch breeder Mme Falken-Rohrle in the 1950s.  These appear to have been unsuccessful.

Puma hybrids
In 1800 and 1900s, various Cougar hybrids with differing big cats were attempted in captivity and reportedly successful, including cougar × leopard (called a pumapard), and cougar × jaguar.

There are also reports of hybridization between cougar and bobcats in the wild, with the offspring colloquially known as "bougar".

Additionally, at least one instance of hybridization between a cougar and an ocelot has occurred in captivity.

Domestic × wild hybridization

The domestic cat, known variously as Felis catus, F. silvestris catus, or F. lybica catus, a descendant of the African wildcat (F. lybica), has been hybridized with several wild felid species.  These wild-domestic hybrids have sometimes been called "feral-domestic hybrids", but this is a misnomer, because feral refers to a domesticated population species which has reverted to living without human caretakers. Most of these are artificial hybrids (i.e., bred intentionally by humans), though natural hybridization has occurred .

Confirmed domestic cat × felid hybrids
Some pairings have given rise to more than one variety, bred for distinctive appearances and different percentages of wild felid genes. They may thus form distinct breeds with separate breed standards, though many of these hybrids are not recognized by any major breed registry. Several are the result of accidental  in zoos, or experimental hybridization (as with wolfdogs) for the exotic pet market.

 Bengal: domestic cat × Asian leopard cat (Prionailurus bengalensis, usually the P. b. bengalensis subspecies) 
 Caracat: domestic cat × caracal; first case was accidental in the Moscow Zoo in 1998. Later, it became most expensive and rarest cat breed.
 Chausie: domestic cat × jungle cat species (Felis chaus)
 Kellas cat: Naturally occurring landrace, domestic cat × Scottish wildcat (Felis silvestris silvestris)
 Machbagral, viverral, and jambi: domestic cat × fishing cat (Prionailurus viverrinus)
 Marguerite: domestic cat × sand cat (Felis margarita); kittens were born to a domestic female, in 2013 and another 20 hybrids at United Kingdom in 2017
 Savannah: domestic cat (including Bengal) × serval (Leptailurus serval)

Attempted or unconfirmed hybrids
These crosses are of dubious viability due to genetic divergence between these genera
 "Mandalan jaguar" (proposed name): domestic cat × jaguarundi (Herpailurus yagouaroundi)
 Domestic cat × Canada lynx (Lynx canadensis)
 Domestic cat × bobcat (Lynx rufus): There are reports of bobcats breeding with domestic cats, but evidence of offspring remains circumstantial and anecdotal. Their interfertility is yet to be proven scientifically.
 Domestic cat × Pallas's cat (Otocolobus manul)

Feline × human hybrid claim
The feline protein Fel d 1 has been fused with the human protein FcGamma1, in what has been described on the Internet as a human-animal hybrid, but is technically a fusion protein and not a hybrid organism.

See also
Panthera hybrid

References

Other sources
 I Kusminych & A Pawlowa ("Ein Bastard von Karakal Hauskatze im Moskauer Zoo" in Der Zoologische Garten Vol. 68, No. 4 (1998)) (A Hybrid of Caracal and House Cat in Moscow Zoo).
 Paul Leyhausen (Oncilla x domestic cat hybrids)
 Mike Tomkies, "Wildcats" (and various other works regarding Scottish Wildcats)
 Frances Pitt, "Wild Animals in Britain" (1939) (Scottish Wildcat hybrids)
 Edward Hamilton, 1896 (Scottish Wildcat hybrids)
 LYNX AND BOBCAT HYBRIDS

External links and online references 
 
 Hybrids between Wild and Domestic Cats
 Hybrid Felids (non-domestic)
 Interesting facts about the hybrid cats (German version)

 
Hybrids
Intergeneric hybrids